Subaşı may refer to:

Subaşı, Akçakoca
Subaşı, Cumayeri
Subaşı, Edirne, a town in Meriç district of Edirne Province, Turkey
Subaşı, Karacabey
Subaşı, Kemaliye
Subaşı, Lapseki
Subaşı, Yalova, a town in Altınova district of Yalova Province, Turkey
Subaşı, Sincik, a village in Sincik district of Adıyaman Provin, Turkey
Subaşı, Gölbaşı, a village in Gölbaşı district of Ankara Province, Turkey
Subaşı, Yapraklı
Subaşı, Yenişehir, a village in Yenişehir district of Bursa Province, Turkey
Subaşı (title), an Ottoman gubernatorial title
Subaşı (surname), a Turkish-language surname